Dharavi Assembly constituency is one of the ten constituencies of Maharashtra Vidhan Sabha located in the Mumbai City district.

It is a part of the Mumbai South Central (Lok Sabha constituency) along with five other assembly constituencies, viz Sion Koliwada, Wadala, Mahim, from Mumbai City district and Chembur and Anushakti Nagar from Mumbai Suburban district.

Members of Legislative Assembly

Election results

Assembly Elections 2019

Assembly Elections 2014

Assembly Elections 2009

Assembly Elections 2004

References 

Assembly constituencies of Mumbai
Assembly constituencies of Maharashtra